The Buffalo mayoral election of 1881 saw the election of former Erie County Sheriff Grover Cleveland, who defeated architect and alderman Milton Beebe by what was considered a broad margin.

Cleveland would not serve out his entire term as mayor, as he would be subsequently elected Governor of New York the following year.

Results

References

Buffalo
1881
Buffalo
Grover Cleveland